is one of the seven mat holds, Osaekomi-waza, of Kodokan Judo. In grappling terms, it is categorized as a side control hold.

Technique description 
Graphic
from http://judoinfo.com/techdrw.htm

Kuzure-Kesa-Gatame occurs naturally with many Judo throws
where tori wraps an arm around uke's waist,
if tori follows the throw to the ground.

Exemplar Videos:

Demonstrated,
Kuzure-Kesa-Gatame into Mune-Gatame,
from http://www.sjjk.co.uk/videos.htm.

Instructional Video

Escapes 
Kuzure-Kesa-Gatame Roll Over/Bridge Escape

Submissions 
Kesa Ashi Gatame/Armbar with the legs
Waki Gatame Arm Bar
Calf and Forearm Choke
Sankaku Jime

Technique history

Included systems 
Systems:
Kodokan Judo, Judo Lists
Lists:
The Canon Of Judo
Judo technique
The video, The Essence of Judo featuring Kyuzo Mifune
Kuzure kesa gatame(崩袈裟固)
Ura gesa(裏袈裟)

Similar techniques, variants, and aliases 
IJF Official Names:
Kuzure-kesa-gatame(崩袈裟固)
KKE

English aliases:
Broken scarf hold
Modified scarf hold

Variants:
Ura kesa gatame(Ura gesa)(裏袈裟固)
Funakubo Gatame(舟久保固)

Similar:
Kesa-Gatame

Judo technique